Snelgrove is a former hamlet in Brampton, Ontario, Canada, straddling the border between Brampton and Caledon, and centred on the intersection of Hurontario Street and Mayfield Road. It was known as Edmonton in the 1800s after the home town of local settlers.

The area's boundaries creates a deviation of the Brampton/Caledon boundary which is otherwise bisected by Mayfield Road, to include the entire community within Brampton, which was done when Chinguacousy Township was abolished and split between Brampton and Caledon in 1974. The western end is located at the Orangeville Brampton Railway railway tracks west of Robertson Davies Drive,  northern end just north of Collingwood Road / Highwood Road,  eastern end just east of Etobicoke Creek. Previously known as Edmonton,  it was renamed in 1880s by Canadian Pacific Railway to avoid confusion with another CPR stop in what is now Edmonton,  Alberta. The area's name is linked to the local Snell family (led by John Snell and brothers whom settled in Chinguacousy Township in 1838).

Highway 410 has been extended to a new terminus in Snelgrove, at Hurontario Street, which becomes Highway 10 after the 410 merges with it, about 1 km. north of Mayfield Road.

Among others, businesses in Snelgrove include a Shoppers Drug Mart, Sobeys, and Tim Hortons.

The Canadian Pacific Railway (previously Credit Valley Railway) line from Streetsville to Owen Sound passed through Snelgrove, and there was a station for passenger trains. Today all that is left of the site is a few railway sidings that shortline operator Orangeville Brampton Railway occasionally uses.

References

External links
Snelgrove at Geographical Names of Canada

Neighbourhoods in Brampton

fr:Caledon
pt:Caledon